SS Ethelbert Nevin was a Liberty ship built in the United States during World War II. She was named after Ethelbert Nevin, an American pianist and composer from Pennsylvania.

Construction
Ethelbert Nevin was laid down on 1 June 1944, under a Maritime Commission (MARCOM) contract, MC hull 2486, by the St. Johns River Shipbuilding Company, Jacksonville, Florida; sponsored by Miss Doris Nevin, the daughter of the namesake, and was launched on 18 July 1944.

History
She was allocated to the Moore-McCormack Lines, Inc., on 31 July 1944. On 19 December 1947, she was laid up in the National Defense Reserve Fleet, Wilmington, North Carolina. She was sold for scrapping, 19 February 1960, to Bethlehem Steel Co., for $70,161. She was removed from the fleet, 13 March 1960.

References

Bibliography

 
 
 
 

 

Liberty ships
Ships built in Jacksonville, Florida
1944 ships
Wilmington Reserve Fleet